Dominion is the eighteenth studio album by American rapper Tech N9ne, the seventh in his "Collabos" series. The album was released on April 7, 2017, by Strange Music. It features the entire Strange Music roster and it was solely produced by the label's in-house producer Seven, with the exception of "Jesus and a Pill" being co-produced by Joshua S. Barber

Track listing
 All tracks produced solely by Seven, except "Jesus and a Pill" was co-produced by Joshua S. Barber.

Charts

References

2017 albums
Tech N9ne albums
Strange Music albums